The 1992 BYU Cougars football team represented Brigham Young University (BYU) for the 1992 NCAA Division I-A football season. The team was led by head coach LaVell Edwards and played their home games at Cougar Stadium in Provo, Utah. The cougars participated as members of the Western Athletic Conference.

Schedule

Roster

Season summary

Hawaii

1993 NFL Draft

References

BYU
BYU Cougars football seasons
Western Athletic Conference football champion seasons
BYU Cougars football